Ajdovščina Airport  is a local airfield and tourist airport in the Vipava Valley, Slovenia. The airport was originally built for the Battles of the Isonzo and is today home to the Josip Križaj Ajdovščina Aeroclub and the ultralight aircraft manufacturer Pipistrel. The flying club is named after the Slovene war ace Josip Križaj (a.k.a. Giuseppe Krizai).

References

External links 
 Ajdovščina Airport - the Slovenian government site 
 Josip Križaj Ajdovščina Aero Club - homepage

Airports in Slovenia